Ashley John Palmer (born 9 November 1992) is an English footballer who plays as a defender for National football league club Chesterfield

Career 
Palmer progressed through the Barnsley youth ranks but was released in February 2009 and signed for Scunthorpe United where he became youth team captain. Palmer signed his first professional contract in June 2010 on a one year deal. He made his professional debut on 30 August 2011, in the Football League Trophy 2–0 win over Hartlepool United at Glanford Park.

He joined Southport on loan in January 2012.  Later that season he joined Harrogate Town on loan and made his club debut in a 2–1 home defeat to Vauxhall Motors. He was released by Scunthorpe in May 2012.

Palmer signed for Hinckley United in September 2012. He made his debut in a 2–0 home loss against Halifax Town a day later. In October, he moved, signing for Droylsden.

In June 2015, Palmer signed for FA Trophy holders North Ferriby United bringing to an end his two-year stay at Buxton. Palmer won promotion to the National League and was awarded Player of the Year at North Ferriby, an accolade he had also received in the 2014/15 season while playing for Buxton.

After spending two seasons at Guiseley, Palmer joined Stockport County in July 2018. Palmer established himself as an crucial member of the Stockport defence in their title winning 2018/19 campaign, often captaining the side in the absence of club captain Paul Turnbull.

Palmer further consolidated his presence in the Stockport back line during the 2019/20 season with a string on highly consistent performances which saw also saw him score five league goals, leaving him Stockport's third top scorer for the season behind Elliot Osbourne and Nyal Bell.

After promotion to the Football League in the 2021–22 season, Palmer signed a new one-year contract with the club in June 2022 to keep him with the club for a fifth season.

On 25 November 2022, Palmer returned to the National League when he signed for Chesterfield for an undisclosed fee, signing an eighteen-month contract.

International career 

In March 2022, Palmer was called up to represent England C and made his debut on 30 March 2022 against Wales C, a League of Wales representative team. Palmer captained England on the night.

Career statistics

Honours
Stockport County
National League: 2021–22

References

External links 

1992 births
Living people
Sportspeople from Pontefract
English footballers
Association football defenders
Scunthorpe United F.C. players
Southport F.C. players
Harrogate Town A.F.C. players
Hinckley United F.C. players
North Ferriby United A.F.C. players
Droylsden F.C. players
Buxton F.C. players
Guiseley A.F.C. players
Stockport County F.C. players
Chesterfield F.C. players
English Football League players
Northern Premier League players
National League (English football) players